Truth (stylized as truth) is a national campaign aimed at eliminating teen smoking in the United States.   produces television and digital content to encourage teens to reject tobacco and to unite against the tobacco industry.  When  launched its campaign in 1998, the teen smoking rate was 23%.  In 2018, tobacco products were used by 7.2% of middle schoolers and 27.1% of high schoolers.  In August 2014,  launched "Finish It", a redesigned campaign encouraging youth to be the generation that ends smoking.

History

Florida Tobacco Pilot Program

The  campaign was a campaign developed by the Florida Tobacco Program, which ran from 1998 to 2003.

Through their marketing campaign, the program set out to drive a wedge between the tobacco industry's advertising and a youth audience. The program not only assembled a team of advertising and public relations firms, but also collaborated with Florida youth to develop a campaign that would effectively speak to their generation. Youth articulated their frustrations with the manipulative marketing tactics used by the tobacco industry, and described their ideal campaign as one that would give them facts and the truth about tobacco.  From this emerged the concept of uniting youth in a movement against tobacco companies promoted through grassroots advocacy and a youth-driven advertising campaign.

In March 1998, student delegates at a meeting sponsored by Florida's Office of Tobacco Control voted to change the theme of the campaign to "truth, a generation united against tobacco." In April 1998, Florida launched a $25 million advertising campaign that included 33 television commercials, seven billboards, eight print ads and four posters. With a target audience of youth aged 12–17, the Florida  campaign modeled their approach after commercial marketing to teens, and used messages that "attacked the [tobacco] industry and portrayed its executives as predatory, profit hungry, and manipulative." The ads re-framed tobacco as an addictive drug promoted by the adult-establishment, and tobacco control as a hip, rebellious, youth-led movement. The grassroots effort of the campaign involved real teenagers taking on the tobacco industry as part of the 13-day "Truth Train" tour across the state.  Despite positive results, reduced funding for the program, among other factors, ultimately led to the demise of Florida's  campaign. One of the notable leaders of this campaign was Cleveland Robinson, who not only was the first of 10 student leaders to lead the statewide campaign, but was also a part of the Truth Train leadership team.

Truth Initiative  campaign

As Florida's campaign diminished, Truth Initiative (originally the American Legacy Foundation) adopted Florida's successful strategy and converted  into a national campaign. Generally consistent with Florida's campaign, Truth Initiative's version of  featured messages highlighting the deceptive practices of tobacco companies, and facts about the deadly effects of tobacco.

Campaign strategy and style

 strives to be a brand youth can identify with. In stark contrast to the heavy "life or death" tone adopted by many anti-tobacco campaigns, the strategy behind  is to emphasize the facts about tobacco products and industry marketing practices, without preaching or talking down to its target audience.  The resonating theme underlying  is one of tobacco industry manipulation.  With hard-hitting advertisements featuring youths confronting the tobacco industry,  built a brand focused on empowering youth to construct positive, tobacco-free identities. Above all, the campaign avoids making directive statements telling youth not to smoke, and instead encourages them to make up their own minds about smoking and the tobacco industry.  channels youths’ rebellious nature and need to assert their independence towards tobacco control efforts.

In addition to exposing industry marketing practices, many of the advertisements produced for  focus on facts about the ingredients in cigarettes and the consequences of smoking, including addiction, disease, and death.  A large portion of the facts and information exposed in  advertisements were pulled from real tobacco industry documents that were made publicly accessible following the Master Settlement Agreement.  The Truth Tobacco Documents Library, created in 2002 and managed by the University of California San Francisco, houses millions of formerly secret tobacco industry internal corporate documents.

Initial tactics and campaigns 
The  campaign's initial objective was to "change social norms and reduce youth smoking."  In building a strategy to accomplish this goal,  campaign designers looked to marketing and social science research, evidence from other successful campaigns, and engaged in conversations with teen audiences. This research revealed that although youth were aware of the deadly nature of cigarettes, they were attracted to smoking as a tool for rebellion and empowerment. The  campaign designers wanted to counter the appeal of cigarettes by encouraging teens to rebel against the duplicity and manipulation exhibited by tobacco companies.

For example, the  advertisement "1200" portrays a mass of youth walking up to a major tobacco company building, then suddenly collapsing as if dead while a single youth remains standing with a sign that reads, "Tobacco kills 1,200 people a day. Ever think about taking a day off?" In the "Body Bags" commercial, youth pile body bags on the sidewalk outside of Philip Morris's (now former) headquarters in New York City. One youth steps forward with a megaphone to shout up at the workers in the building, "...Do you know how many people tobacco kills every day? This is what 1200 people actually looks like." Another  advertisement, "Singing Cowboy", portrays a cowboy who has a breathing stoma (opening) in his neck singing, "you don't always die from tobacco, sometimes you just lose a lung", and other similar lyrics. A third commercial, "1 out of 3", uses "fantasized scenes such as an exploding soda can" to convey the message that tobacco is the only product that prematurely kills one out of three users. Perhaps one of truth's best-known campaigns, "Shards O' Glass", aired during Super Bowl XXXVII. The commercial showed an executive for a popsicle company, "Shards O' Glass", that provided disclaimers for their product – a popsicle with shards of glass in it, clearly unsafe and deadly – and posed the question, "What if all companies advertised like big tobacco?"

Through social media feedback and focus group testing,  designers learned teens respond best to "up-front and powerful messages that display courage and honesty in a forceful way."  With that in mind, other edgy  advertisements with various themes were produced between 2000 and 2014, including "Connect truth", "The Sunny Side of truth", "Unsweetened truth", and "Ugly truth."

Prior to the launch of the Food and Drug Administration's "Real Cost" campaign in February 2014,  was the only national youth tobacco prevention campaign not sponsored by the tobacco industry.

Campaign re-launch strategy and examples 
In August 2014,  launched the "Finish It" campaign targeting the next generation of U.S. youth aged 15 to 21.  Along with a revamped campaign design, web presence, and series of ads, Finish It embraces a powerful new campaign theme: be the generation that ends smoking for good.  In research with its target audience, campaign designers discovered today's teenagers are less interested in protesting against tobacco industry manipulation, and more interested in driving positive collective action.  "Finish It" was developed to suit this generation's desire to be agents of social change. The campaign aims to empower 94 percent of teenage nonsmokers, and 6 percent of teen smokers, to take an active role in ending the tobacco epidemic.

The first campaign ad released, "Finishers", was shot in the style of a video manifesto and tells the youth, "We have the power. We have the creativity. We will be the generation that ends smoking. Finish it."  The spot encouraged youth to get involved in the "Finish It" movement by superimposing the campaign logo, an "X" in an orange square, onto their Facebook profile picture. This online activism tactic is similar to that used by the Human Rights Campaign when they asked individuals to change their profile pictures in support of marriage equality.

In another series of "Finish It" ads, "Unpaid Tobacco Spokesperson" and "Unpaid Tobacco Spokesperson Response", the campaign tries to shed light on the way smokers, especially celebrity smokers, give tobacco companies free marketing as "unpaid spokespeople" when their photos are posted. As a response, Finish It asked youth to "think before you post a smoking selfie." The campaign also encouraged youth to "erase and replace" cigarettes from photos on social media with various props from the  website.

In 2015, "Left Swipe Dat," a full-length song and music video created as part of the "Finish It" campaign, debuted at the 57th Annual Grammy Awards and connected smoking to dating.  The video featured Becky G, Fifth Harmony, King Bach and other influencers.  The lyrics revealed that you get half the matches on dating apps if you're smoking in your profile picture.  "Left Swipe Dat" encouraged teens to lose the cigarettes so they could avoid being "left swiped", that is, passed over on a dating app.

In another effort to connect smoking to a teen passion point, "CATmageddon" showed teens that smoking is bad for pets and set up the scenario that if there were no cats (due to smoking-related illness and disease) there would be no cat videos and therefore there would be a "CATmageddon", a "world devoid of furry kittens and the adorable, hilarious videos that come with them."  The ad launched at the 58th Annual Grammy Awards and featured partnerships with Petco, Adult Swim, and BuzzFeed.

In 2017, the  campaign showed how the tobacco industry has targeted African-Americans, low-income communities, LGBTQ individuals, members of the military as well as those with mental health conditions.  The campaign encouraged young people to take note of the industry's advertising tactics while educating teens on the tobacco-related health disparities across these demographics.  Initial documentary style videos created for this campaign featured comedian and actress Amanda Seales and premiered at the 59th Annual Grammy Awards.  Later videos, premiered at the 2017 MTV Video Music Awards and featured journalists Kaj Larsen and Ryan Duffy, as well as rapper Logic.

In 2018,  launched anti-vaping campaign ads showing the dangers of vaping for the first time.

Grassroots tours 
In addition to its television advertisements,  maintains an online presence and employs guerrilla "on-the-street" marketing.  Grassroots marketing is done via a team of "truth tour riders" who are sent to popular music and sporting events across the country every summer, including Warped Tour, Mayhem Festival and High School Nation.

Merchandise 
 also produces a line of custom merchandise every summer that is distributed at events.  Each piece of merchandise features a design that corresponds with a fact about smoking.  Items are often created in partnership with artists, such as a pair of custom sneakers made in collaboration with Kevin Lyons and Vans shoes.  That partnership also spawned a contest called "Custom Culture" where students competed in design challenges relevant to the campaign's merchandise and subject matter.

Evaluation and effectiveness

Rigorous evaluation studies of  have been published in the peer-reviewed literature since the launch of the campaign in 2000. Its efforts include evaluation of televised truth ads as well as digital, gaming and grassroots campaign components. Between 1999 and 2004, Truth Initiative (known at the time as the American Legacy Foundation) conducted a nationally representative Media Tracking Survey of youth aged 12–17 to inform its  campaign evaluation. The Legacy Media Tracking Survey (LMTS) measured tobacco-related attitudes, beliefs, and behaviors, exposure to smoking influences including , sensation seeking, and openness to smoking.

Cross-sectional studies on the effectiveness of the  campaign provided convincing evidence that the campaign "had a significant impact on tobacco industry-related attitudes, beliefs, and other behavioral precursors, as well as a significant impact on youth smoking prevalence in the United States." In 2005, a study published in the American Journal of Public Health conducted by RTI International, Columbia University, and Truth Initiative used a pre/post quasi-experimental design to relate changes in national youth smoking prevalence to exposure to the  campaign over time. The study's statistical analyses showed that smoking rates among youth in the U.S. declined at a faster rate after the launch of the  campaign. A similar study published in the American Journal of Preventive Medicine in 2009 found a direct association between youth exposure to  messaging and a decreased risk of taking up smoking.

A 2009 study examined whether the $324 million investment in the  campaign could be justified by its effect on public health outcomes.  Researchers found that the campaign was economically efficient because it saved between $1.9 and $5.4 billion in medical care costs to society between 2000-2002.  In this way, the authors argue  is a cost-effective public health intervention.

A study evaluating the "Finish It" campaign indicated lower intentions to smoke in the next year as well as anti-tobacco attitudes with higher ad awareness.  Ad recall remained high, even when the campaign aired lower levels of television targeted rating points as compared with earlier  advertising campaigns.

Awards and praise 
The  campaign has been praised by a number of leading federal and state public health officials, as well as the U.S. Centers for Disease Control and Prevention, and the U.S. Department of Health and Human Services. The campaign has also been recognized for its achievements in marketing with numerous awards in advertising efficacy, such as Emmy, Clio Healthcare, and Effie awards.   has also been featured in a variety of academic marketing and communications textbooks to educate the next generation of public health and social marketing leaders.

In 2014, Advertising Age named truth one of the top 10 ad campaigns on the 21st century.

In 2016, the Monitoring the Future study, which surveys national samples of over 45,000 youth in grades 8, 10 and 12, reported historically low levels of current cigarette use amongst youth - only 6 percent of teens still smoke.

Litigation

A  campaign radio ad called "Dog Walker" prompted Lorillard Tobacco Company to pursue litigation against Truth Initiative (then the American Legacy Foundation). The dispute ran from July 2001 until its resolution in July 2006. The  advertisement states urine and tobacco both contain urea.

Cases were filed in both Delaware and North Carolina. The matter was resolved by the Delaware Supreme Court on July 17, 2006. They ruled unanimously that the  campaign did not violate the Master Settlement Agreement.

See also
 Truth Initiative
 Master Settlement Agreement
 Tobacco control
 Project SCUM

References

External links
  campaign website
 Truth Initiative website
 truth campaign advertisements

American health websites
Internet memes
Internet properties established in 1998
Public service announcement organizations
Smoking in the United States
Tobacco control